Ken Rosenthal (born September 19, 1962) is an American sportswriter and reporter. He serves as a field reporter for Fox Major League Baseball since 2005, and was an in-studio reporter for MLB Network from 2009 to 2022.  Since August 2017, he is a senior baseball writer for The Athletic.

Career

Beginnings
Rosenthal graduated from the University of Pennsylvania in 1984. After serving as an intern covering sports for Newsday on Long Island, he began his career at the York Daily Record in 1984.  He moved on to the Courier-Post in Cherry Hill, New Jersey for two years before landing a full-time job with The Baltimore Sun, where he was named Maryland Sportswriter of the Year five times by the National Sportscasters and Sportswriters Association during his tenure from 1987 to 2000.  Rosenthal simultaneously contributed to Sports Illustrated from 1990 to 2000, providing weekly notes during baseball season. He then spent five years at The Sporting News until 2005.

Fox Sports
Rosenthal joined Fox Sports in 2005. He regularly wears a bow tie when appearing on Fox Sports telecasts in support of various charitable organizations. In 2015 and 2016, Rosenthal won the Sports Emmy Award for Outstanding Sports Reporter for his work with Fox Sports and MLB Network.

In June 2017, FoxSports.com eliminated its writing staff to focus only on video, leaving Rosenthal without an editorial home.  He began posting stories on his Facebook page. However he continues to contribute to Fox Sports as a field reporter for their baseball coverage.

The Athletic
Rosenthal joined The Athletic in August 2017 as a senior baseball writer.

MLB Network
Rosenthal joined MLB Network in 2009 as a "baseball insider." 

With MLB Network, Rosenthal contributed to Trade Deadline and National Baseball Hall of Fame coverage, as well as the offseason weekday morning show Hot Stove.

Rosenthal's contract was not renewed by MLB Network in January 2022, reportedly for his criticisms of Rob Manfred.

References

External links
Rosenthal's stories on The Athletic
Rosenthal's stories on FoxSports.com

1962 births
Living people
American sportswriters
American reporters and correspondents
Major League Baseball broadcasters
MLB Network personalities
Jewish American writers
People from Oyster Bay (town), New York
University of Pennsylvania alumni
21st-century American Jews